Akita Broadcasting System, Inc. (ABS, 株式会社秋田放送) is a Japanese broadcaster in Akita Prefecture. Its radio station is affiliated with Japan Radio Network (JRN) and National Radio Network (NRN), and its TV station is affiliated with Nippon News Network (NNN) and Nippon TV Network System (NNS).

Headquarters
 1-2 1 Banchi, Nakadori 7-chome, Akita city Akita Japan. 010-8611
 Tel. +81-18-824-8533 (Main desk)

Channels

Radio
ABS Radio
 Akita 936 kHz JOTR 5 kW; 90.1 MHz FM 1 kW
 Odate 1557 kHz JOTE
 Asamai(Yokote) 1485 kHz JOTO
 Kazuno 801 kHz
 Honjo 1557 kHz

Analog TV
JOTR-TV - ABS Television
 Akita 11Ch
 Odate 6Ch
 Honjo 10Ch
 etc...

Digital TV(ID:4)
JOTR-DTV - ABS Digital Television
Akita(Main Station) 35ch
Omagari 25ch
Odate 17ch

Programs

Radio
 Asadori Wide Akitabin
 Gokujo Radio
 Fureai Request etc...

TV
 Yudoki
 NNN News Realtime Akita etc...

Announcers
Jennifer Wooden

Item
 Akita Sakigake Shimpo

Rival Stations 
Akita Television(AKT)
Akita Asahi Broadcasting(AAB)

External links 

 ABS HomePage

Akita Northern Happinets
Companies based in Akita Prefecture
Television stations in Japan
Radio in Japan
Nippon News Network
Mass media in Akita (city)
Television channels and stations established in 1960